Whitehorse South Centre was a territorial electoral district in Yukon. Serving the city of Whitehorse, the district elected one member to the Yukon Territorial Council from 1974 to 1978, and to the Yukon Legislative Assembly from 1978 to 1992.

Members

Election results

|-

| Independent
| Jack Hibberd
| align="right"|267
| align="right"|
| align="right"|

| Independent
| Tony Penikett
| align="right"|143
| align="right"|
| align="right"|

| Independent
| Ron Veale
| align="right"|130
| align="right"|
| align="right"|
|-
! align=left colspan=3|Total
! align=right|
! align=right|
|}

|-

| Progressive Conservative
| Jack Hibberd
| align="right"|245
| align="right"|
| align="right"|

| Liberal
| Bert Law
| align="right"|197
| align="right"|
| align="right"|

| NDP
| Ken Krocker
| align="right"|122
| align="right"|
| align="right"|
|-
! align=left colspan=3|Total
! align=right|
! align=right|
|}

|-

| NDP
| Roger Kimmerly
| align="right"|203
| align="right"|
| align="right"|

| Progressive Conservative
| Neil Hayes
| align="right"|127
| align="right"|
| align="right"|

| Liberal
| Mimi Stehelin
| align="right"|116
| align="right"|
| align="right"|

| Independent
| Chuck Rear
| align="right"|97
| align="right"|
| align="right"|
|-
! align=left colspan=3|Total
! align=right|
! align=right|
|}

|-

| NDP
| Roger Kimmerly
| align="right"|328
| align="right"|
| align="right"|

| Progressive Conservative
| Chuck Rear
| align="right"|320
| align="right"|
| align="right"|

| Liberal
| Carol Christian
| align="right"|108
| align="right"|
| align="right"|
|-
! align=left colspan=3|Total
! align=right|
! align=right|
|}

|-

| NDP
| Roger Kimmerly
| align="right"|346
| align="right"|
| align="right"|

| Progressive Conservative
| Ron Granger
| align="right"|303
| align="right"|
| align="right"|

| Liberal
| Arthur Giovinazzo
| align="right"| 85
| align="right"|
| align="right"|
|-
! align=left colspan=3|Total
! align=right|
! align=right|
|}

|-

| NDP
| Joyce Hayden
| align="right"|350
| align="right"|
| align="right"|

| Progressive Conservative
| Gerry Thick
| align="right"|228
| align="right"|
| align="right"|

| Liberal
| Phil Wheelton
| align="right"|163
| align="right"|
| align="right"|
|-
! align=left colspan=3|Total
! align=right|
! align=right|
|}

Former Yukon territorial electoral districts
Politics of Whitehorse